Turris higoensis is an extinct species of sea snail, a marine gastropod mollusk in the family Turridae, the turrids.

Description

Distribution
Fossils of this marine species were found in Paleogene strata in Kyushy, Japan (age range:48.6 to 40.4 Maa)

References

  T. Nagao. 1928. Palaeogene fossils of the Island of Kyushu, Japan Part I. Science Reports of the Tohoku Imperial University 9(3):97-128

higoensis
Gastropods described in 1928